Galina is a rural locality (a village) in Leninskoye Rural Settlement, Kudymkarsky District, Perm Krai, Russia. The population was 19 as of 2010.

Geography 
Galina is located 31 km southwest of Kudymkar (the district's administrative centre) by road. Kosogor is the nearest rural locality.

References 

Rural localities in Kudymkarsky District